Soul Crusaders was a Japanese pop and soul group, formed in 2000 and disbanded in 2002 under Giza Studio label.

Biography
In October 2000, they've made major debut with the single Safety Love which became their smash hit, ranked #30 in Oricon Weekly charts. The lyricist from Garnet Crow, Azuki Nana and composer Aika Ohno were involved with the music production of single. With this song they've made their first TV appearance in Japanese music program Hey! Hey! Hey! Music Champ. This song was included in the compilation album Giza Studio Masterpiece Blend 2001.

In 2001 they've released two singles "Lonesome Tonight" and "Baby My Sunshine". With their second single they've made their final TV appearance on same music program as in October 2000. In October 2001 after year of the debut they've released their first and only studio album Flavor of Life which ranked #28 in Oricon Weekly Charts. On December King Opal has made guest appearance in the GIZA studio R&B PARTY at the "Hills Pan Koujou.

They band hardly ever made any media appearance and occasionally appeared in magazine interviews.

The band has disbanded without any announcement in 2002. The presence of King Opal and Tomomi is unknown after 2002. In 2002 Terao participated as guest member at the Giza Event Hotrod Beach Party. Nowadays he is working actively as a music producer and mentor in the Giza Music School Creators. In credits he's mentioned as an ex.Soul Crusaders.

Members
The members are:
  - vocalist and lyricist
 King Opal - lyricist, rapper
  - composer, leader, keyboard, backing vocals

Discography
During their career they've released 1 studio, 3 singles.

Singles

Studio albums

Magazine appearances
From Music Freak Magazine
Vol.70 2000/9
Vol.71 2000/10
Vol.72 2000/11
Vol.73 2000/12
Vol.75 2001/2
Vol.79 2001/6
Vol.82 2001/9
Vol.83 2001/10
Vol.86 2002/1

From J-Groove Magazine:
December 2000 Vol. 2
April 2001 Vol. 6
August 2001 Vol. 10
November 2001 Vol. 13

References

External links
 Official Website
 English site
 Being Giza profile

Musical groups established in 2000
Musical groups disestablished in 2002
Japanese pop music groups
Being Inc. artists
Living people
Year of birth missing (living people)